Paras is a 1971 Indian Hindi-language film starring: Sanjeev Kumar, Raakhee, Mehmood, Farida Jalal, Shatrughan Sinha and Madan Puri.

Plot
Dharam Singh is an honest farmer in rural India, and lives with his sister, Bela, who is now of marriageable age. One day both brother and sister witness a murder, and haul the killer to the nearest police station, where the killer is charged, arrested, and held for court. The killer is none other than the powerful and influential Arjun Singh's brother. When Arjun learns that Dharam and Bela are the only witnesses to this murder, he attempts to bribe them, albeit in vain, and his brother is sentenced to be hanged. In order to escape Arjun's wrath, Dharam relocates to the city, to earn a living, and thereby help his sister get married. Arjun sets fire to Dharam's house in the village, abducts Bela, and attempts to rape her, but she escapes, and searches for Dharam. After several months, she spots Dharam in the city in the company of a rich woman, Barkha. When she approaches Dharam, he refuses to recognize her, and has nothing to do with her.

Cast
 Sanjeev Kumar as Dharam Singh
 Raakhee as Barkha Singh
 Mehmood as Munna Sarkar
 Farida Jalal as Bela Singh
 Shatrughan Sinha as Thakur Arjun Singh
 Madan Puri as Thakur Prithvi Singh
 Mukri as Manager
 Murad as Judge
 Viju Khote as Munna Sarkar friend

Music

The film's music was composed by the duo Kalyanji Anandji and the film's songs were written by Indeevar, Qamar Jalalabadi and Verma Malik.

"Man Mera Tujhko Mange, Dur Dur Tu Bhage" - Suman Kalyanpur
"Tere Honthon Ke Do Phul Pyaare Pyaare" - Mukesh, Lata Mangeshkar
"Sajna Ke Samne Main To Rahungi Chup" - Asha Bhosle
"Gali Gali Aur Gaon Gaon Me Pito Aaj Dhindhora" - Kishore Kumar
"O Jugni Kehti Hai Baat Pate Ki, Yaad Rakhna Ye" - Asha Bhosle
"Suno Saathiyon, Sacchai Se Bad Kar Dharm Nhi Koi Duja" - Asha Bhosle, Mahendra Kapoor

Awards and nominations
 Filmfare Best Comedian Award for Mehmood
 Filmfare Award for Best Supporting Actress for Farida Jalal

External links

1971 films
1970s Hindi-language films
Films scored by Kalyanji Anandji